Ayaneo (variously stylized as AYANEO, AyaNeo or Aya Neo) is a Chinese brand of handheld gaming computers using the Microsoft Windows operating system and AMD Ryzen processors.

Devices

Ayaneo Air / Ayaneo Air Pro (2022) 
The Air device uses the Windows 11 operating system, a Ryzen 5 5560U processor, 8 or 16 GB RAM, a 5.5'' 1080p OLED screen and 128GB or 512GB SSD storage, expandable via an SD card. The Pro variant has some improved specifications.

Eurogamer wrote that the Ayaneo Air provides lower graphics performance than its main competitor, the Steam Deck, due to the Air's older GPU architecture. According to IGN, the Air provides acceptable performance with modern games at a lower 720p resolution, but not at the screen's native resolution. But the reviewers praised the Air for its better screen, portability and compatibility with Windows games compared to the Steam Deck, the latter owing to the Air being a native Windows device, as opposed to the Linux Proton compatibility layer used by the Steam Deck.

Ayaneo Next / Ayaneo Next Pro (2022) 
The Next is a larger and more powerful device compared to the Air, using a Ryzen 7 5800U processor, 16 GB RAM, a 7'' 1280×800 pixel touchscreen and 2TB SSD storage.

IGN described it as an "impressive" handheld gaming PC, capable of playing modern games at high frame rates, but noted a number of "quirks and challenges" such as controller glitches.

Aya Neo (2021) 
The Aya Neo was the first model of handheld gaming computer sold under the Ayaneo brand, and originally financed through crowdfunding. It used a Ryzen 5 4500U processor, 16 GB RAM, 512GB or 1TB SSD storage, and a 7'' 1280×800 pixel touchscreen.

Reviewers described its performance as acceptable for less demanding games, and the device as a whole as a relatively expensive and novel type of device for a "niche crowd" of handheld PC gamers.

References 

Handheld personal computers
X86-based computers
2021 in video gaming
2021 introductions
Indiegogo projects